Kishtwar Assembly constituency is one of the 87 constituencies in the Jammu and Kashmir Legislative Assembly of Jammu and Kashmir a north state of India. Kishtwar is also part of Udhampur Lok Sabha constituency.

Members of the Legislative Assembly

Election results

2014

2008

See also
 List of constituencies of the Jammu and Kashmir Legislative Assembly
 Kishtwar district

References

Kishtwar district
Assembly constituencies of Jammu and Kashmir